The mixed doubles was an event on the Tennis at the 1900 Summer Olympics program in Paris. It was held from 6 to 11 July at the Île de Puteaux. There were 12 competitors (6 teams) from 4 nations, with 3 of the teams being mixed teams. The event was won by British pair Charlotte Cooper and Reginald Doherty. The other three medals were taken by the three mixed teams: Hélène Prévost of France and Harold Mahony of Great Britain earned silver, while the bronze medals went to the Bohemian/British combination of Hedwiga Rosenbaumová and Archibald Warden and the American/British pair of Marion Jones and Laurence Doherty. All 5 of the British players thus ended up receiving a medal.

Background

This was the debut appearance of mixed doubles tennis. The event would not be held again until 1912 (when both outdoor and indoor versions were held); it would then be held the next two Games in 1920 and 1924. Tennis was not a medal sport from 1928 to 1984, though there were demonstration events in 1968 (which included mixed doubles) and 1984 (which did not). Mixed doubles did not return with the rest of the tennis programme in 1988; instead, it was not until 2012 that mixed doubles returned to the programme, where it has been since.

Great Britain's Charlotte Cooper and Reginald Doherty were by far the strongest pair; Cooper won the women's singles while Doherty earned bronze in the men's after refusing to play his brother Laurence in the semifinals. Laurence and American Marion Jones Farquhar were expected to be a formidable pair as well.

Competition format

The competition was a single-elimination tournament with no bronze-medal match (both semifinal losers tied for third). All matches were best-of-three sets. Mixed-nationality teams were allowed.

Schedule

Draw

Draw

Results summary

References

External links
  ITF, 2008 Olympic Tennis Event Media Guide

X=Mixed doubles
1900
1900 in French women's sport
Mixed events at the 1900 Summer Olympics